'Miłosz Biedrzycki (MLB
) (born 1967 in Koper, Yugoslavia) is a Polish poet, translator and geophysical engineer. One of the authors of the "brulion generation".

His poems appeared in various literary magazines, including brulion, Trafika, Boston Review, Chicago Review, Fence and Washington Square Review. Biedrzycki is the author of eight books of poetry published in Poland, two published in Slovenia, and one in the USA. He translated poetry of Tomaž Šalamun (Jabłoń, Zielona Sowa 2004). He was a 2010 resident of the International Writing Program at the University of Iowa. A brother of Mariusz Biedrzycki.

Bibliography
Poetry
 *, (1993)
 OO, (1994)
 Pył/Łyp, (1997)
 No i tak, (2002), 
 Sonce na asfaltu/Słońce na asfalcie/Il sole sull'asfalto, (2003), 
 69, (2006), 
 wygrzebane, (2007), 
 Sofostrofa i inne wiersze, (2007), 
 69 (American version), (2010), 
 Życie równikowe, (2010), 
 1122 do 33 (collaboration with Artur Płaczkiewicz), (2012), 
 Vrlina špargljev, (2013), 
 Porumb'', (2013),

Other works
 Biedrzycki, W. & Biedrzycki, M. (1991): Pit Water as a Source of Thermal Energy. – Proceedings, 4th International Mine Water Association Congress, 1: 13–23, 4 Abb., 1 Tab.; Ljubljana.

References

External links
 Homepage

1967 births
Living people
Polish poets
Writers from Koper

International Writing Program alumni